City Under Siege is the fifth studio album by American rapper E.S.G., from Houston, Texas. It was released on April 25, 2000, via Wreckshop Records. The album peaked at #65 on the Top R&B/Hip-Hop Albums, #22 on the Independent Albums and #30 on the Heatseekers Albums in the US Billboard charts.

Track listing

Personnel

Cedric Dormaine Hill – main artist, vocals
Darrell "D Gotti" Monroe – featured artist (tracks: 5, 12, 18)
Ronnie Spencer – featured artist (tracks: 7, 10, 13)
Derrick "D-Reck" Dixon – featured artist (tracks: 16-18), executive producer
Tyson "Tyte Eyes" Duplechain – featured artist (tracks: 2, 14)
Kenneth "Big Moe" Moore – featured artist (tracks: 4, 16)
Dirty $ – featured artist (tracks: 14, 16)
Milton "Big Pokey" Powell – featured artist (track 2)
Todd Anthony Shaw – featured artist (track 3)
DeShawn Hill – featured artist (track 6)
Stayve Jerome Thomas – featured artist (track 6)
William "Will-Lean" Gibbs – featured artist (track 7)
Ore Magnus Lawson – featured artist (track 7)
Nutty Black – featured artist (track 9)
Jainea – featured artist (track 11)
Kano – featured artist (track 12)
Christopher Dejwan Gallien – featured artist (track 12)
Ben "Mista Madd" Thompson – featured artist (track 14)
J-Mac – featured artist (track 14)
Devin C. Copeland – featured artist (track 15)
André "Double D" Sargent – featured artist (track 15), producer (tracks: 11, 13, 17), co-producer, engineering
Lil' Shay – featured artist (track 16)
Derrick "Noke D" Haynes – featured artist (track 18), producer (tracks: 2, 7, 12, 16, 18), production coordinator, co-producer, engineering & mixing
Blue – producer (tracks: 1, 4, 6, 9, 14-15)
Lil' James – producer (tracks: 5, 8, 10)
Sean "Solo" Jemison – producer (track 3)
Skip Holman – engineering & mixing
Deon – engineering
Donavin "Kid Styles" Murray – art direction, design, photography

Charts

References

External links

2000 albums
E.S.G. (rapper) albums
Gangsta rap albums by American artists